April Meservy is an independent singer/songwriter.

History
Meservy performed in Salt Lake City's Olympic Square during the 2002 Winter Olympics.

She self-released her first album, Somewhere Between Sunsets, in early 2010, on her Forêt d'Musique (Jèrriais: "Forest of Music") label.

In 2017, her cover of U2's "With or Without You" was selected by Canadian pair figure skaters Eric Radford and Meagan Duhamel for their short program for the season and into the 2018 PyeongChang Winter Olympic Games, where they won team gold and individual bronze medals.  Meservy's rendition reached the Top 40 on iTunes.

In 2018, she released an EP, The Good-Morrow.

In 2019, she starred as Charity Barnum, alongside Sam Humphrey, Chelsea Caso, Martha Nichols, Mishay Petronelli, Luciano Acuna Jr., and David Osmond, in a special production of The Greatest Showman, featuring live performances synchronized with film footage.

Discography

Albums
 The Good-Morrow EP (2018)
 "The Quiet Life" (Kasey Chambers cover song)
 "Murder in the City" (Avett Brothers cover song)
 "Angel" (Sarah McLachlan cover song)
 "Fix You" (Coldplay cover song)
 Somewhere Between Sunsets (2010)
 "Truth Speak"
 "Not Going Under"
 "Rainstorms & Calypso Rings"
 "Marks of my Path (Mountain)"
 "I Like Mondays"
 "Looks Like Change"
 "Decide"
 "Will She"
 "More of Less"
 "All That I Can Be"
 "Unbroken"
 "I'll Sleep"

Released singles 
 "With or Without You" (U2 cover) (2017)
 "I'll Be Home for Christmas" (2017)
 "Home Means Nevada" (SIERRA SUNSET MIX) (2017)
 "Home Means Nevada" (SAGE MIX) (2016)
 "Winter" (2008)
 "What Child Is This?" (2006)

Compilation albums
 The Best of Efy 2004-2006 (2007) - "The Light", "I Know He Lives"
 A Child's Prayer (2006) - "Mary's Lullaby"
 The Greatest Gift: Especially For Youth 2006 (2006) - "Light Will Rise"
 Stand in the Light: Especially For Youth 2004 (2004) - "The Light"

Music videos

Music label 
In 2007, Meservy started an independent music label, Forêt d'Musique, (Jèrriais: "Forest of Music") to release her music.

Personal life
On August 3, 2018, Meservy married David GrandPre in the Payson Utah Temple.

References

External links 
  
 Last.fm profile

Living people
Musicians from Reno, Nevada
American women singer-songwriters
Year of birth missing (living people)
21st-century American women
Singer-songwriters from Nevada